Strange Angels is the fifth album overall and fourth studio album by performance artist and singer Laurie Anderson, released by Warner Bros. Records in 1989.

With this release, Anderson attempted to move away from her previous image as a performance artist into a more musical realm. Although music had always been part of her performance, it was never brought to the fore as much as it was on Strange Angels. Anderson did more singing on this album than she did on previous albums. As a result, completion of this album was delayed for nearly a year when Anderson decided that she needed to take singing lessons; in the process she discovered that she was a soprano.

The album includes contributions from vocal artist Bobby McFerrin. Its cover photo was shot by Robert Mapplethorpe, who died several months before the album's release. One of the songs on this album, "The Dream Before" (also known as "Hansel and Gretel Are Alive and Well") had been introduced several years earlier in her short film What You Mean We? while she had performed "Babydoll" and "The Day the Devil" years previously on Saturday Night Live.

Reaction to Anderson's new direction was mixed, with some critics praising her new style, while some accused her of abandoning her performance art roots, even though Anderson soon began work on a major piece titled The Nerve Bible. Her next album would not be released for five years.

Strange Angels received a nomination for a Grammy Award for Best Alternative Music Album.

"Beautiful Red Dress" was covered in Portuguese by the Brazilian singer Marina Lima, on her 2006 album La nos Primordios, titled "Vestidinho Vermelho" ("Little Red Dress").

"The Dream Before" contains the iconic phrase "history is an angel being blown backwards into the future" and further references and quotes Walter Benjamin's musing on Paul Klee's painting Angelus Novus, the ninth of Benjamin's Theses on the Philosophy of History.

Track listing
All lyrics and music composed by Laurie Anderson; except where indicated

 "Strange Angels"  – 3:51
 "Monkey's Paw"  – 4:33
 "Coolsville"  – 4:34
 "Ramon"  – 5:03
 "Babydoll"  – 3:38
 "Beautiful Red Dress"  – 4:43
 "The Day the Devil" (Anderson, Peter Laurence Gordon) – 4:00
 "The Dream Before"  – 3:03
 "My Eyes"  – 5:29
 "Hiawatha"  – 6:53

Personnel

Laurie Anderson – vocals, keyboards, percussion programming, drums on "Coolsville"
Arto Lindsay – guitar
Ray Phiri – guitar 
John Selolwane – guitar
Chris Spedding – guitar
David Spinozza – guitar
Jimi Tunnell – guitar
Scott Johnson - guitar
Gib Wharton – pedal steel guitar
Peter Scherer – bass, keyboards, drum programming
Mark Dresser – bass
Mark Egan – bass
Bakithi Khumalo – fretless bass
Tony Levin – Chapman stick
David LeBolt – keyboards, synthesizers
Robbie Kilgore – keyboards
Mike Thorne – keyboards, percussion, drum programming
"Blue" Gene Tyranny – keyboards
Tom "T-Bone" Wolk – accordion
Joey Baron – drums
Anton Fier – drums
Steve Gadd – drums
Manolo Badrena – percussion
Cyro Baptista – percussion
Bill Buchen – percussion
Errol "Crusher" Bennett – percussion
Sue Hadjopoulos – percussion
David Van Tieghem – percussion
Naná Vasconcelos – percussion
Jimmy Bralower – drum programming
Leon Pendarvis – drum programming
Ian Ritchie – drum programming
Alex Foster – alto saxophone
Lenny Pickett – tenor saxophone, horn arrangements
Louis Del Gatto – baritone saxophone
Laurie Frink – trumpet
Earl Gardner – trumpet
Steve Turre – trombone, conch shell
Hugh McCracken – harmonica
Bobby McFerrin – vocals
Phillip Ballou – backing vocals
Benny Diggs – backing vocals
Lisa Fischer – backing vocals
Yolanda Lee – backing vocals
Meat Loaf – backing vocals, chant
Paulette McWilliams – backing vocals
B.J. Nelson – backing vocals
Angela Clemmons-Patrick – backing vocals
The Roches – backing vocals
Darryl Tookes – backing vocals
Diane Wilson – backing vocals
Technical
Eric Liljestrand - recording engineer, Macintosh programming, drum programming, sampling
Neil Dorfsman, Bob Clearmountain, Jay Healy, Josh Abbey - mixing
Robert Mapplethorpe - photography

"Babydoll"
The lyrics to this song appeared on the liner for the vinyl recording, centered and formatted into the shape of a doll.

Music videos
In lieu of filming a standard music video to promote the album, Anderson instead taped a series of 60-second "Personal Service Announcements" in which she humorously discussed the economy and American culture. She later produced a music video for "Beautiful Red Dress".

References

1989 albums
Laurie Anderson albums
Warner Records albums
Albums produced by Mike Thorne